Lovzar (fun in Chechen language) is a Chechen children's dance ensemble that has conducted worldwide tours and has been an important face of Chechen culture to the world.

Founded in 1983 in the Republican Pioneers Palace in Grozny, Lovzar disbanded in 1994 due to the First Chechen War, but in 1995 the heads of Lovzar recruited thirty boys and thirty girls to restart the group.  Based in exile in Nalchik, Kabardino-Balkaria, the newly assembled group trained in traditional Chechen dance.  Subsequently, the group has been awarded numerous awards in many countries; it is worth mentioning that the Chechen pop singer and noted beauty Makka Sagaipova is a member of this group.

External links

Chechnya Free.ru Article on Lovzar

Chechen dances
Dance in Russia
Folk dance companies
Performing groups established in 1983